Galla (died 394) was a Roman empress as the second wife of Theodosius I. She was the daughter of Valentinian I and his second wife Justina.

Family 
Little is known of Galla, including her full name. Galla is the female cognomen for Gallus and, in Latin, gallus could mean both an inhabitant of Gaul and a rooster.

Galla is listed as one of four children of the marriage by Jordanes. Her paternal uncle Valens was Emperor of the Eastern Roman Byzantine Empire from 364 to his death in the Battle of Adrianople (9 August 378). Her father was emperor of the Western Roman Empire from 364 to his death on 17 November 375 and was previously married to Marina Severa. The only known child of that marriage was Gratian, Western Roman Emperor from 375 to his assassination on 25 August 383. Her mother was previously married to Magnentius, a Roman usurper from 350 to 353. However both Zosimus and the fragmentary chronicle of John of Antioch report that Justina was too young at the time of her first marriage to have children. Galla thus had no known maternal half-siblings.

Galla had three full-siblings. Her only brother was Valentinian II, first co-emperor with Gratian from 375 and then the only legitimate Western Roman Emperor from 383 to his death by hanging on 15 May 392. His death was officially reported as a suicide but Arbogast, his magister militum, was suspected to have had a hand in it, an accusation found in the writings of Socrates of Constantinople, Orosius, and Zosimus. Sozomen was less certain and mentioned both versions of how Valentinian II died.

Her two sisters were Grata and Justa. According to Socrates, both remained unmarried. They were probably still alive in 392 but not mentioned afterward.

Marriage to Theodosius 

Galla was cast into a role of significance because of conflict between three Roman emperors in the 380s. In 383, Gratian died while facing a major revolt under Magnus Maximus. Maximus proceeded to establish his control of a portion of the Roman Empire including Britain, Gaul, Hispania, and the Diocese of Africa. Ruling from his capital at Augusta Treverorum (Treves, Trier), he was able to negotiate his recognition by Valentinian II and Theodosius I starting in 384. Valentinian II's territory was effectively limited to Italia, ruling from Mediolanum (modern Milan).

In 387, the truce between Valentinian II and Maximus ended. Maximus crossed the Alps into the Po Valley and threatened Mediolanum. Valentinian and Justina fled their capital for Thessaloniki, capital of the Praetorian prefecture of Illyricum and at the time the chosen residence of Theodosius. Galla accompanied them. Theodosius was then a widower, his first wife Aelia Flaccilla having died in 385 or 386.

Theodosius granted refuge to the fugitives. According to Zosimus's account, Justina arranged for Galla to appear weeping before Theodosius and to appeal for his compassion. Galla was reportedly a beautiful woman and Theodosius was soon smitten and requested to marry her. Justina used this to her advantage, setting a condition for the marriage agreement under which Theodosius would have to attack Maximus and restore Valentinian II to his throne. Theodosius consented to Justina's condition, the marriage probably taking place in late 387. The account was questioned by Louis-Sébastien de Tillemont as inconsistent with the piety of Theodosius. He suggested that the marriage took place in 386, prior to the beginning of hostilities. On the other hand, Edward Gibbon in his The History of the Decline and Fall of the Roman Empire considered Zosimus' account more likely.

In Theodoret and Tyrannius Rufinus's accounts, religious ardor fueled Theodosius' decision to start the war, contradicting Zosimus' tale of Galla's involvement. Zosimus' explanation, as well as Theodoret's and Rufinus', has been disputed by modern scholars, who believe Theodosius' march against Maximus and union with Galla to be based on calculations of political gain. The marriage would cement his dynastic alliance to Valentinian II and enable him to control the newly installed Western ruler.

Empress 
When Galla married Theodosius, she became both a Roman empress and a stepmother to Theodosius’ two sons from his first marriage, Arcadius and Honorius. Arcadius was the eldest and had been declared an Augustus in January 383. He served as a nominal co-ruler to his father but was still approximately ten years old at the time of Galla's marriage.

In July and August of 388, the combined troops of Theodosius I and Valentinian II invaded the territory of Maximus under the leadership of Richomeres, Arbogast, Promotus, and Timasius. Maximus suffered a series of losses and surrendered in Aquileia. He was executed on 28 August 388 along with his son and nominal co-ruler Flavius Victor. Elen, his wife, and his two daughters were spared. Justina's condition for the marriage had been met, however she died the same year, unable to witness the result of her efforts.

Theodosius installed Valentinian and his court at Vienne in Gaul, away from Milan and the influence of Ambrose. Theodosius appointed Arbogast as magister militum for the Western provinces. Acting in the name of Valentinian, Arbogast was actually subordinate only to Theodosius.

Theodosius spent the years 388–391 in Italia, while Galla and her stepsons remained in the Great Palace of Constantinople. According to Marcellinus Comes, in 390 Arcadius expelled her from the palace. However, since Arcadius was only thirteen, that decision could as well have belonged to those who governed in his name.

Zosimus reports her mourning over the death of her brother in 392. On August 22 of the same year, Arbogast declared Eugenius as an emperor without the approval of Theodosius. Negotiations with Theodosius to achieve recognition were unsuccessful and, on 23 January 393, Theodosius declared his second son Honorius, an Augustus, the implication being that Theodosius alone was legitimate emperor. Conflict between the two emperors began the following year, resulting in the Battle of the Frigidus, on 5–6 September 394. Theodosius was victorious and gained control of the entire Roman Empire while Arbogast committed suicide and Eugenius was executed.

Whether Galla lived to see the victory is uncertain. According to Zosimus, she died in childbirth within the same year, the exact date unknown.

Tillemont interpreted a passage of Philostorgius to identify Galla as an adherent of Arianism, however the passage actually seems to mean that her mother was Arian. Galla herself is identified as an Arian in the Chronicon Paschale.

Children 
Galla had three children with Theodosius who were:
 Gratian, a son born in 388 and who died in 394;
 Aelia Galla Placidia, a daughter (392–27 November, 450), her only child to survive to adulthood and who later became an empress in her own right. She married Ataulf, king of the Visigoths, and, after his death, Constantius III;
 John, a son, who died with his mother in childbirth in 394.

References

Sources 
 Rodgers, N., The History and Conquests of Ancient Rome, Hermes House, 2005.
 Roberts, Walter E., Valentinian I (364–375 A.D), roman-emperors.org.
 Woods, David, Theodosius I (379–395 A.D.), roman-emperors.org.
 Smith, William, Dictionary of Greek and Roman Biography and Mythology, ancientlibrary.com.
 
 Prosopography of the Later Roman Empire, Google Books, Galla's sister Iusta.

370s births
394 deaths
4th-century Roman empresses
Arian Christians
Deaths in childbirth
Theodosian dynasty
Valentinianic dynasty
Daughters of Roman emperors